The 2007 Slovenian Supercup was a football match that saw the 2006–07 PrvaLiga champions Domžale face off against Slovenian Cup champions Koper. The match was held on 14 July 2007 at the Sports Park in Domžale.

Match details

See also
2006–07 Slovenian PrvaLiga
2006–07 Slovenian Football Cup

References

Slovenian Supercup
Supercup
Slovenian Supercup 2007
Slovenian Supercup 2007